(), previously known as  (1964–2014), is a weekly French news magazine. Based in the 2nd arrondissement of Paris, it is the most prominent French general information magazine in terms of audience and circulation. Its current editor is Cécile Prieur.

History and profile
The magazine was established in 1950 as L'Observateur politique, économique et littéraire. It became L'Observateur aujourd'hui in 1953 and France-Observateur in 1954. The name Le Nouvel Observateur was adopted in 1964. The 1964 incarnation of the magazine was founded by Jean Daniel and Claude Perdriel.

Since 1964, Le Nouvel Observateur has been published by Groupe Nouvel Observateur on a weekly basis and has covered political, business and economic news. It features extensive coverage of European, Middle Eastern and African political, commercial and cultural issues. Its strongest areas are political and literary matters and it is noted for its in-depth treatment of the main issues of the day. It has been described as "the French intellectuals' parish magazine", or more pejoratively as "the quasi-official organ of France's gauche caviar [caviar left]".

The magazine's internet site was launched by Patrick Fiole and Christina Sourieau in 1999.

The magazine's new charter, adopted in June 2004 (on the 40th anniversary of its foundation), outlines the paper's principles: "The Nouvel Observateur is a cultural and political weekly whose orientation belongs within the general social-democratic movement. A tradition ever concerned with combining respect for freedom and the quest for social justice."

André Gorz and other journalists who had left L'Express helped to found the publication. The owners of Le Monde purchased a 65% stake in the magazine in 2014. On 12 March 2014 the two co-directors of the press group, Laurent Joffrin and Nathalie Collin, resigned because the Nouvel Observateur was being sold to Le Monde.

Alongside its editorial activities, the Nouvel Observateur group bought the online news site Rue89 in December 2011, becoming its only shareholder. On 23 October 2014, the magazine was renamed L’Obs and its layout was changed to include in-depth reports on investigations, stories and discussions of ideas.

Related publications
TéleObs is a supplement containing articles about TV and cinema. It was published every two weeks until October 2014, when it began to be published weekly.

Challenges is an international business magazine published by Le Nouvel Observateur since 1982. Released every two weeks, it contains information on companies and their managers at the CEO level all around the world.

Le Nouvel Observateur formerly published ParisObs, a general information supplement with a focus on Paris and the Île-de-France region, also published weekly.

Circulation
The circulation of Le Nouvel Observateur was 385,000 copies in 1981, 340,000 copies in 1987 and 370,000 copies in 1988.

In 2001-2002, the magazine had a circulation of 471,000 copies. In 2010, its circulation was 502,108 copies, making it the best-selling European news magazine.

The magazine had a circulation of 526,732 copies during the first half of 2013 and 460,780 copies in 2014.

See also

L'Express - conservative news magazine
Le Point - conservative news magazine

References

External links 
 L'Obs website
 Mobile version
 The Nouvel Observateur's 2004 Charter

1964 establishments in France
French-language magazines
News magazines published in France
Weekly magazines published in France
French news websites
Magazines established in 1964
Magazines published in Paris